Hermann Vermeil (1889–1959) was a German mathematician who produced the first published proof that the scalar curvature is the only absolute invariant among those of prescribed type suitable for Albert Einstein’s theory. The theorem was proved by him in 1917 when he was Hermann Weyl's assistant.

Notes

External links

1889 births
1959 deaths
20th-century German mathematicians
Differential geometers